Handpan is a term for a group of musical instruments that are classified as a subset of the steelpan.  Several handpan makers and brands have emerged in recent years, resulting from a growing worldwide interest in the Hang, which is an instrument developed by the company PANArt that is based on the physical properties of the Trinidadian steelpan, Indian ghatam, Thai gong and Indonesian Gamelan etc.

The basic form of a handpan consists of two metal half-shells glued together, a centre tone field (named Ding) surrounded by a circle of at least seven tone fields on the upper side and an opening in the bottom side (named Gu). Differences between manufacturers include the used materials, the manufacturing processes of the raw forms, the shaping of the tone fields and the tuning methods.

History
The term handpan first appeared online in the autumn  of 2007 on the website of an American steelpan producer Pantheon Steel.  It was used to describe its own development of a new instrument that was launched as an alternative to the Hang.
 
Consequently, the term found its way into discussions in the now-defunct Hang-Music Forum on the Internet.  The successor of this forum was founded in 2009 and was called handpan.org.  In this way, the expression handpan found wide circulation as a new generic term for this group of instruments.

Handpan had become a necessary and universally understood term since PANArt had registered the name Hang as trademark for its musical instruments.  It even started filing legal cases against other makers.  However, on almost all counts these cases were unsuccessful, since the instrument's physical form was not protected under international patent law.

The first five instruments that are generally included by the term handpan, were Caisa by Kaisos Steel Drums (Germany, 2007), BElls by BEllart (Spain, 2009), Halo by Pantheon Steel (USA, 2009) and Spacedrum by Metal Sounds (France, 2009).

Today, significantly more than 400 handpan builders have entered the market and offer instruments that vary widely in material, manufacturing techniques, shape, sound and quality.

Discussion about the term
The term handpan has been discussed with much controversy over the instrument's relatively short life.  Critics pointed out that the Hang, which most makers of the handpan use as a standard model, is essentially defined through its difference from the steelpan, even though it is based on the same physical principles.

Furthermore, the term pan is used for the national culture of the steel bands in Trinidad and Tobago.  Supporters stressed the necessity of a generic term.  They advocated that handpan is a suitable and well-understood new term for the abbreviation of a steelpan played by hand.  It has become a conventionalised expression among those who are interested in these kinds of instruments, and in popular culture.

The Hang makers of PANArt, Felix Rohner and Sabina Schärer, reject the expression handpan to describe the Hang. "To state it clearly and precisely: we do not make percussion instruments, handpans or hang drums."

An alternative term used by some builders and players is pantam. It is said to be a combination of the words pan and ghatam, two instruments that influenced the creation of the Hang. Originally this term was an alternative name for the Hang in Israel.

See also 
 Steelpan
 Hang
 Steel tongue drum

References

Pitched percussion instruments